Woman's Christian Temperance Union Public Fountain (W.C.T.U. Fountain) is a historic temperance fountain at Clarinda and Sheridan Streets in Shenandoah, Iowa, United States.

It was built in 1912 by the Woman's Christian Temperance Union to provide water as an alternative to alcohol consumption. The fountain honored Mrs. Lavina Nichols, the local founder of the Shenandoah WCTU chapter. The sign and column were added ten years later. The fountain was added to the National Register of Historic Places in 1984.

See also
 Woman's Christian Temperance Union Fountain (Rehoboth Beach, Delaware)
 Drinking fountains in the United States

References

National Register of Historic Places in Page County, Iowa
Buildings and structures completed in 1912
Buildings and structures in Page County, Iowa
Drinking fountains in the United States
Woman's Christian Temperance Union
1912 establishments in Iowa
History of women in Iowa